The Hotel Lucia, formerly the Imperial Hotel, is a historic hotel building in downtown Portland, Oregon, United States. It was built in 1909 as an extension of the adjacent, original Imperial Hotel. The original Imperial building was made into a separate hotel in 1949, renamed the Plaza Hotel, and after a period of non-hotel use in the 1980s it today operates as the Kimpton Hotel Vintage Portland.

The 1909 building retained its original name until 2002, when the Aspen Hotel Group purchased it, remodeled it as a boutique hotel, and renamed it Hotel Lucia.

The building was added to the National Register of Historic Places in 2003, listed as New Imperial Hotel and described as having Early Commercial architecture.

See also
National Register of Historic Places listings in Southwest Portland, Oregon

References

External links
 
Hotel Lucia (official website)

1910 establishments in Oregon
Hotel buildings completed in 1910
Hotel buildings on the National Register of Historic Places in Portland, Oregon
Southwest Portland, Oregon
Skyscraper hotels in Portland, Oregon